Markona railway station is a railway station on the South Eastern Railway network in the state of Odisha, India. It serves Markona village. Its code is MKO. It has three platforms. Passenger, Express and Superfast trains halt at Markona railway station.

Major trains

 Dhauli Express
 East Coast Express
 Bangriposi–Bhubaneswar Superfast Express

See also
 Balasore District

References

Railway stations in Balasore district
Kharagpur railway division